Benigno "Ninoy" Aquino Jr. (1932-1983) was a Filipino politician.

Ninoy Aquino may also refer to any of the following, all of which were named for the senator:

Ninoy Aquino International Airport near Manila
Ninoy Aquino Stadium in Manila
Ninoy Aquino Parks & Wildlife Center in Quezon City
Ninoy Aquino Learning Resources Center at the Polytechnic University of the Philippines, Manila
Ninoy Aquino Day, a national holiday in the Philippines
Sen. Ninoy Aquino, Sultan Kudarat, a municipality in Sultan Kudarat province
Ninoy Aquino Avenue, a major road in Metro Manila
Ninoy Aquino station, a proposed LRT station in Parañaque